The Columbia 22 is an American trailerable sailboat that was designed by William Crealock and first built in 1966.

The Columbia 22 design was developed into the Coronado 23, with the addition of a new coach house roof design.

Production
The design was built by Columbia Yachts in the United States from 1966 until 1972, with 1,541 boats completed, but it is now out of production.

A number of boats were sold as kits for amateur construction, under the name of Sailcrafter Custom Yachts.

Design
The Columbia 22 is a recreational keelboat, built predominantly of fiberglass, with wood trim. It has a masthead sloop rig, a slightly raked stem, a nearly-plumb transom, an internally mounted spade-type rudder controlled by a tiller and a fixed fin keel or optional stub keel and centerboard. The stub keel/centerboard model was only produced in small numbers. It displaces  and carries  of cast iron ballast.

Boats built from 1970 and later have different hatch locations and an outboard motor well.

The boat is normally fitted with a small  outboard motor for docking and maneuvering.

The design has sleeping accommodation for four people, with a double "V"-berth in the bow cabin, and two straight settees in the main cabin, one combined with the dinette table. The galley is located on the starboard side just forward of the companionway ladder. The galley is equipped with a stove, ice box and a sink. The optional head is located under the bow cabin "V"-berth.

Operational history
In a 2010 review Steve Henkel wrote, "Over 1,500 of these boats were made over a seven-year period. They were available either in the 3' 2" fixed-keel version shown here, or as a keel/centerboarder (draft board up 2' 6", down 4' 10"). At some point during Columbia Yacht Corporation’s life (between 1961 and 1978), in addition to their regular finished boats, the company sold a line of kit boats under the name Sailcrafter Custom Yachts. As a result, some Columbia 22s on the used market may include such aberrations as no sliding main hatch or no outboard well, the result of a home builder deciding it was too much trouble to complete that part of the kit. Best features: The cast iron keel, if shaped as shown in the inboard profile and properly faired, will add measurably to performance on the race course. The boat's PHRF rating suggests that, with her long waterline and low wetted surface, she will be fast relative to her comp[etitor]s. Worst features: The dinette is less than 30 inches wide, good for seating two but impossible for four. The fin keel and draft of over three feet might give problems at the launch ramp."

See also
List of sailing boat types

References

External links

Photo of a Columbia 22

Keelboats
1960s sailboat type designs
Sailing yachts
Trailer sailers
Boats designed by W. I. B. Crealock
Sailboat types built by Columbia Yachts